The Guam Basketball Association (GBA) is a men's professional basketball league in the United States territory of Guam. Promoted by the Guam Basketball Confederation, it is the tiny island-nation's FIBA-recognized basketball league.

History
The GBA had its first season in 2015.

Before the start of the GBA's third season on April 2, 2017, the league announced the creation of the WGBA, a women's league sponsored by the GBA. As of 2021, there was no evidence the WGBA had been inaugurated in Guam.

Teams
There are seven teams competing in the league; these teams are usually sponsored by major companies. Among those teams and their corporate sponsors:
Auto Spot Phoenix, sponsored by Auto Spot
University of Guam Tritons, by the University of Guam
KFC Bombers, by American food retailer KFC
MVP Stars
Mitsubishi Outlanders, by Japanese car maker Mitsubishi
MacTech Nerds. by MacTech (a magazine owned by Apple Computers)
Toothfairies

Players
Some of the GBA players have played for the Guam national basketball team. Players in the league include:
Ollie Bradley
Earvin Jose

References

2015 establishments in Guam
Basketball in Guam
History of Guam
Sports leagues established in 2015